Vairag is a  town in Barshi Taluka of Solapur district in Maharashtra, India. The village is located centrally between Solapur and Barshi.

Its population is approximately 45,000 as per 2011 census.

Vairag is a village with the second biggest population in Maharashtra. The Nagar panchayat (Village parish council) incorporates the  main village and  56 small villages and hamlets  inside its legal boundary.

The village also has one of the big sugar factories in Solapur district at Bhogawati. The village also  has growing MIDC owned industrial park.

Geography 
Sasure (5 km), Ghanegaon (5 km), Sarjapur (5 km), Ladole (6 km), Irle (6 km), Tulshidas Nagar (2 km), Manegav (2 km) are the nearby villages.

Vairag is surrounded by Mohol Taluka on the south, Osmanabad Taluka and Tuljapur Taluka towards the east, and Madha Taluka towards the west.

Osmanabad, Tuljapur, Solapur, Pandharpur, Mohol, and Kurduvadi are the nearest towns and cities to the village.

History 
Vairag is full of ancient temples. The village is well known for its Aadat bazaar and livestock (bullock) market. The first Prime Minister of India Pandit Jawaharlal Nehru also visited the village.

The village hosts a large fair (Jatra) in honour of  Shri. Santanath Maharaj carnival(Yatra) in August, on the day of Narali-Pournima.. Public entertainment on day includes  Lezim, Jazz-Pathak, Dhol-Tasha etc.

Transport

By Railway 
There is no railway station near to Vairag in less than 10 km. Solapur Jn Rail Way Station (near to Solapur), Barsi Town Rail Way Station (near to Barshi), Solapur Junction Railway Station (near Solapur), Umed Railway Station (near Osmanabad), Uplai Railway Station (near to Barshi) are the railway stations reachable from nearby towns.

By Road 
Barshi, Osmanabad, Bhum, Tuljapur, Solapur, Mohol, Kurduwadi, Madha are the nearby by towns to Vairag having road connectivity to Vairag

Public amenities

Health
The village has a Rural Health Training Center.

Education 
The town is well known in the region for its educational institutions, and nearby villages depend upon these educational facilities.

Primary and secondary education
Tulshidas Jadhav Prashala
 Vidhyamandir high school
Savitribai phule primary school
Arnav modern high school
  Vidhya mandir all girls school
Anuradhatai institute primary and secondary high school
Daffodils primary school
Navin marathi school
Shardadevi high school

Tertiary Education
 Anuradhatai institute BA and BEd College
 Polytechnique College of engineering
 Suvarnlata Gandhi college of arts
Indira college of engineering
Sai Ayurvedha BAMS College

References 

Villages in Solapur district